South Korean band CNBLUE has released 32 music videos and 23 video albums. The band has appeared on various television shows, as well as its own documentary film.

Music videos

Video albums

Filmography

Television

Film

References

Videography
Videographies of South Korean artists